Alicia Banit (born 5 September 1990) is an Australian actress and dancer best known for her role as Kat in the Australian Broadcasting Corporation (ABC) television series Dance Academy. She also appeared in various Australian television series, being the main cast in We Were Tomorrow or having recurring roles in Playing for Keeps.

Biography 
Banit first acting appearance was in the Australian film Dead Letter Office, playing a younger version of the main character Alice. In 2006, she had a two episode minor role in the Network Ten soap opera Neighbours as Madison Sullivan, then in 2008 she returned to the soap for another two episode role, this time portraying Sharni Hillman. From 2007 to 2009 she had two guest roles on the Australian version of the Disney Channel series As The Bell Rings playing Amber. In 2007, she was cast in Chris Lilley's television series Summer Heights High as Kaitlyn for the duration of the first season. In 2008, Banit appeared in Rush as Gemma Rose Parker acting alongside former Neighbours actress Eliza Taylor-Cotter. In 2009, she was Leah in season one of the Australian drama series Tangle. In late 2009, she was cast as one of the main characters Katrina Karamakov in the ABC television series Dance Academy. From 23 August 2010 to 27 August 2010, she acted as a co-host on the ABC3 wrapper program Studio 3 alongside Kayne Tremills and Amberly Lobo.

Filmography

References

External links 

20th-century Australian actresses
21st-century Australian actresses
Living people
1990 births
Australian female dancers